The Miss Ecuador 1986 competition was on March 27, 1986. There were 16 candidates for the national title. The previous winner, María Elena Stagnl from Guayas, crowned her successor, Verónica Sevilla from Pichincha as Miss Ecuador 1986. Sevilla competed at Miss Universe 1986.

Results

Placements

Special awards

Contestants

Notes

Returns

Last compete in:

1984
 Los Ríos

Withdrawals

 El Oro

References

External links
http://www.eluniverso.com/2003/03/16/0001/257/C9DF7F5C65CE4A93AE73A0C89B00FC35.html
https://web.archive.org/web/20060504031208/http://www.missecuador.net/exreinas/2000.htm
http://www.explored.com.ec/noticias-ecuador/miss-ecuador-con-once-candidatas-140552-140552.html
http://www.eluniverso.com/2003/03/29/0001/257/596C7321EEFA40D896637F585C75D50D.html

Miss Ecuador
1986 beauty pageants
1986 in Ecuador
Beauty pageants in Ecuador